Juraj Jarábek (born 3 October 1962) is a Slovak football manager and former player. 

His father, Stanislav Jarábek, was also a footballer and manager.

Career
He managed Zlaté Moravce since October 2009 until May 2013. In his first season as a manager, they achieved promotion from the second league into the top division. 
He managed Zlaté Moravce in top division for three further seasons, placing on 6th, 7th and 8th place respectively.

Spartak Trnava appointed him as a new manager in May 2013, before the start of the new season. They finished 3rd in his first season and 4th in second. He resigned in August 2015.

Honours

Manager
Zlaté Moravce
DOXXbet liga (1): 2009–10
Dinamo Tbilisi
Umaglesi Liga (1): 2015-16
Georgian Cup (1): 2015-16

References

External links
 Dinamo Tbilisi profile

1962 births
Living people
Slovak footballers
Slovak football managers
Association football defenders
FC Spartak Trnava players
FC Spartak Trnava managers
FC Dinamo Tbilisi managers
Slovak Super Liga managers
Sportspeople from Trnava
Slovak expatriate football managers
Expatriate football managers in Georgia (country)
Slovak expatriate sportspeople in Georgia (country)
MFK Karviná managers
FC ViOn Zlaté Moravce managers
ŠKF Sereď
Czech First League managers
Slovak expatriate sportspeople in the Czech Republic
Expatriate football managers in the Czech Republic